Antoine Gilles Florent Menier (October 13, 1904 – August 12, 1967) was a French businessman and municipal politician who was a member of the prominent Menier family of chocolatiers.

Born in Paris, Antoine Menier was the eldest of the four sons of  Georges Menier (1880–1933) and Simone Camille Marie Legrand (1881–1972). He studied at the Lycée Condorcet in Paris but had little interest in business and did not go on to advanced studies. Instead, he used his wealth to pursue a life of sporting activities. An auto racing enthusiast, Antoine Menier set a number of records driving Alfa Romeo vehicles in hillclimbing events.

He held the mayoral position until 1945 when his uncle Jacques Menier died. Since 1871, Menier family members had been the mayor of the town of Noisiel and Antoine replaced his uncle Jacques as Noisiel's mayor. He held that office until 1959 but was the last Menier to be the town's mayor.

Château de Chenonceau
As a result of his grandfather Gaston Menier's will, in 1935 Antoine Menier inherited Château de Chenonceau in France's Loire Valley. On Antoine's death his estate became the subject of a court battle and ultimately the château was acquired by his widowed sister-in-law, Odette. On her death in 1975, her son Jean-Louis Menier inherited it and made Chenonceau one of France's major tourist attractions.

Decline of the Menier chocolate empire
On his father's death in 1933, Gaston Menier became the co-managing head of the Menier Chocolate company with his brother Hubert. In spite of the difficult times of World War II, in 1950 Menier Chocolate was still the industry leader in France. However, Antoine Menier was ill-equipped to run the company and his brother Hubert lacked the leadership skills to overcome the growing number of problems in what had become an intensely competitive market. On Hubert's death in 1959 there was no Menier family member capable or desirous of replacing him. Married late in life to Parisian fashion model Renée Vigne, Antoine Menier had no children and was the last of the Menier family to head the company.

By 1960 the once mighty Menier Chocolate company was losing substantial amounts of money and merged with the Rozan chocolate company of Oloron-Sainte-Marie. A shell of its former self, the Menier workforce in Noisiel was soon reduced from a peak of more than 2,000 to just a few hundred. By 1965 the Menier family no longer held an interest in the company.

Antoine Menier died in Paris in 1967.

References 

20th-century French businesspeople
French racing drivers
1904 births
1967 deaths
Antoine Gilles
Lycée Condorcet alumni